Sonero: The Music of Ismael Rivera is an album by Miguel Zenón. It received a Grammy Award nomination for Best Latin Jazz Album and also a Latin Grammy Award nomination for Best Latin Jazz/Jazz Album.

References

2019 albums
Latin jazz albums by Puerto Rican artists
Miguel Zenón albums